Emphytoecia niveopicta is a species of beetle in the family Cerambycidae. It was described by Fairmaie and Germain in 1864. It is known from Chile.

References

Pteropliini
Beetles described in 1864
Endemic fauna of Chile